Mendel may refer to:

People
 Mendel (name), includes a list of people with the name
Gregor Mendel (1822–1884), the "father of modern genetics"
 Mendel (Hungarian family), a prominent Hungarian family that flourished in the 15th century
 Yiddish diminutive of Hebrew name Menahem or Menachem

Other
 Mendel University Brno in the Czech Republic (formerly Mendel University of Agriculture and Forestry)
 Mendel Biotechnology, a plant biotechnology company in Hayward, California
 Mendel (lunar crater), a crater on the Moon
 Mendel (Martian crater)
 3313 Mendel, an asteroid named after Gregor Mendel
 Mendelpass, a mountain pass in Northern Italy
  RepRap 2.0 (Mendel), a self-replicating machine

See also
 Mendel Polar Station in Antarctica
 L. Mendel Rivers (1905–1970), US Congressman
 USS L. Mendel Rivers (SSN-686), a US submarine
 Mendele
 Mandel
 Mendelssohn 
 Mendl, a surname
 Mende (disambiguation)